A refrigerated van (also called a refrigerated wagon)  is a railway goods wagon with cooling equipment. Today they are designated by the International Union of Railways (UIC) as Class I.

History
The first wagons were cooled with ice that had been cut in winter from special pools or lakes. It was Gustavus Swift who succeed in the winter of 1877 for the first time in developing an efficient cooling system for railway wagons for Chicago businesses and meat producers. It circulated air through the ice and then through the entire wagon in order to cool it down. This system was the basis of the success of the Union Stock Yard, the Chicago slaughterhouses. The cooled wagons made it possible for the first time to transport the meat of slaughtered animals to the whole of the US. Later, manufactured ice was used, but this rapidly gave way to other means of cooling; the simplest was the substitution of normal (water) ice by dry ice. With the increasing reliability of combustion engines, engine-powered refrigerator vans emerged. There are even vans whose cooling is achieved by the evaporation of liquid gas.

Construction
Compared with machine-cooled vans, ice-cooled wagons have the disadvantage of uneven temperature control, because the cooling effect is only achieved by air circulation. On the other hand, machine-cooled wagons are expensive to maintain and operate, but can be set to the desired temperature and maintained at that temperature throughout the entire journey. Banana transport wagons with gas evaporators have an optimum internal temperature of  In addition to proper refrigerated vans, there are covered wagons with thermal insulation and, in some cases, even those are equipped with  refrigerating sets.

In Asia, Chinese and Kazakh railways are experimenting with using refrigerated rail cars to transport sensitive consumer electronic goods manufactured in China to European markets. The products are transported in climate-controlled rail cars from factory towns in the interior of China to Almaty, Kazakhstan, and from there by air to Europe. The use of insulate climate-controlled cars makes it possible for these kinds of goods to be transported by rail even in winter, which had not been done previously.

Use
In long-distance trains in the former Eastern Bloc countries, refrigerator trains were used that comprised a refrigeration plant wagon, a guards van and several refrigerated vans.

Most food is transported by road nowadays due to the shorter journey times. The stock of refrigerated vans owned by railway companies has therefore shrunk considerably. Most refrigerated vans in Europe today are operated by Interfrigo. These wagons are easy to tell apart externally: white vans are normal refrigerated wagons, blue ones with white stripes along the side are machine-cooled refrigerator vans.

Types
Almost all refrigerated vans currently in service are built to UIC standard classes. The two-axled wagons have the same overall dimensions as the covered goods wagons of classes Gbs or Hbfs.

1) Refrigerated and insulated vans / Refrigerated vans with cooling equipment

See also
 Refrigerator car (covers US practice)

References

External links
 Information on the Intercontainer/Interfrigo wagons
 Refrigerated van from Waggonau Dessau

Food preservation
International Union of Railways
Freight rolling stock
Vans